May Pen is a populated settlement located in the nation of Belize. It is a mainland village located in Belize District.

Populated places in Belize District
Belize Rural North